Pheran or Phiran is the traditional outfit for both males and females in Kashmir.

The pheran consists of two gowns, one over the other. The traditional pheran extends to the feet, which was popular up to the late 19th century C.E.  However, a relatively modern variation of the pheran extends to below the knees, which is worn with a suthan inside (loose form of shalwar) similar to the styles worn in Afghanistan.

It is optional to wear the suthan with a long phiran as traditionally lower garments are not worn with pherans. The traditional pheran do not have side slits.

According to some sources, the pheran was introduced by Mughal emperor Akbar when he conquered the valley in 1586. 

In summer, the pheran are made of cotton, but in winter, the pheran is made of wool, covering and protecting the body from the cold especially during snow. These dresses are used by the residents of the Kashmir valley and Kashmiris residing in Chenab Valley.

Since Pheran is unique to the kashmiri culture and it is worn particularly to protect oneself from the coolest phase(Chilai Kalan-starts from December 21) in winter, December 21 is now being celebrated as Pheran Day in Kashmir valley.

Etymology
According to one theory, pheran is a corruption of the Persian word 'perahan' which means cloak. The outfit has been in vogue in Kashmir since before the 15th century.

Designs

Head dress

Taranga

Hindu women use a headwear called "taranga", which is a headdress which becomes smaller down at back, towards the heels. It is popular in some areas of Kashmir.

Kasaba

Kashmiri Muslim women use a headwear known as the "kasaba". The kasaba is padded by means of a turban and is pinned together by brooches. A veil made of pashmina or Silk is pinned to the top of the kasaba that descends towards the back of the neck. There are two types of kasaba: "Thoud kasaba" and "Bonn kasaba". Thoud kasaba (high kasaba) sits on the head like a crown, worn only by married women belonging to elite families. House of khwajawal in Naid kadal made the most beautiful kasabas. Bonn kasaba (low kasaba) sits on head like a bandana, worn by commoners and tribal women. The most magnificent and expensive kasabas were made of kashmiri kundan work known as "Jarrah": precious gem stones, usually rubies, spinels and emerald are set in 24 carat gold to make various kundan ornaments (Tikka, Taweez, Hung taweez, Bal hor, kan vass) pinned to the red cap having intricate Kashmiri "Tilla work" (silver thread work). Kundan kasaba was worn only by royals. Kundan kasaba were only made by house of Kundanghar in Khwaja bazar.

Pheran
The pheran is a loose upper garment loosely gathered at the sleeves, which tend to be wide, made of either wool or jamewar, which is a mixture of wool and cotton, with no side slits. A pheran made of wool is called a 'loch'. Female pheran dresses are designed with colorful flowerlike designed elements and styles. Male pheran dresses are quite simple, without any colourful design.

The traditional pheran falls to the feet like a gown. This style was universally worn by the Kashmiri Hindu and Kashmiri Muslim communities into the later 19th century C.E. However, a modern version worn by Muslim people
is of knee-length, loose and stitched at the front side and on the finishes, while Hindu people still wear their pherans long, extending down their legs. Ankle length Pherans are tied at the waist. Intricate embroideries or flower styles are a popular on Kashmiri ladies pherans. The embroideries or flower designs are made of thin metal threads; this kind of embroidery is known as 'Tille' in Kashmiri language.

Poots
The poots is the same as the pheran but made of lighter material; it is worn beneath the pheran. It is generally used to protect the pheran from burns from the kangri. It also provides extra warmth during winters, double layer insulation from the cold winter days.

Suthan/shalwar
Traditionally, the pheran and poots were worn without a lower garment. Indeed, in neighbouring Hunza too, women did not wear pajamas until 1890 and in Nagar until 1925. Since the latter part of the 19th century, loose suthans (shalwars) and churidar pajamas of the Punjab region became popular in Kashmir. Accordingly, the suthan or churidar pajama can form part of the pheran ensemble but is not a must. The Kashmiri suthan is baggy and loose and is similar to the Dogri suthan worn in the Jammu region. Some versions are similar to the shalwars worn in Afghanistan. However, since the 1960s, the straight cut Punjabi salwar has become popular.

Modern fashion
Modern trends saw a decline in the use of pherans in favour of the shalwar kameez. However, there has been a revival in recent years as pherans have become part of modern fashion, and are worn by females of other areas of Kashmir as well. Kashmiri men are also wearing the pheran as a fashionable outfit. Combined with jeans, the pheran has made its way into the office world. The modern pheran is not as wide and long as the traditional ankle or knee-length version and sometimes has side slits. Fewer men are wearing the phiran with a shalwar. Some modern pherans are a hybrid of western raglan coat and traditional wear.

Photo gallery

See also
 Kashmiri people
 Shalwar kameez
 Pulhoer

References

Indian clothing
Culture of Jammu and Kashmir
Kashmir